John Richard Flinn (born September 2, 1954) is an American former professional baseball pitcher. He had been traded from the Orioles to the Brewers for Lenn Sakata on December 6, 1979.

Jim Palmer recalled that "Flinn was a terrific pitcher with Rochester in Triple A. He had a good curve, good control, nice, sinking fastball," though Palmer noted that this was only "When he was relaxed."

References

External links

1954 births
Living people
American expatriate baseball players in Canada
Asheville Orioles players
Baseball players from California
Baltimore Orioles players
Bluefield Orioles players
Charlotte O's players
Hagerstown Suns players
Los Angeles Valley Monarchs baseball players
Major League Baseball pitchers
Milwaukee Brewers players
Miami Orioles players
People from Merced, California
Rochester Red Wings players
Vancouver Canadians players